One of the dialects of the Maltese language is the Cottonera dialect, known to locals as Kottoneran. Many inhabitants of the Three Cities speak the local dialect, and thus roughly amount to 10,000 speakers.

The most distinctive feature of this dialect is its treatment of vowels i and u after the silent consonant għ. In Standard Maltese, and other dialects, these vowels are realized as diphthongs after għ, however, in most situations, they remain monophthongs in the Cottonera dialect.

The vowel I after Għ 
The vowel i after għ remains an /i/ as in the English meet, instead of diphthongizing to /ai/ as in the English like.

This dialectal change does not occur with the words għid (easter), erbgħin (forty), sebgħin (seventy), and disgħin (ninety).

The local poet from Senglea, Dwardu Cachia (1858-1907), formed part of the Xirka Xemija in 1882, an organization which formulated one of the first standardized versions of written Maltese. Moreover, Cachia wrote a poem about this very alphabet, in which he made use of the 4-line rhyme. Coincidentally, the ABCB rhyme of the second stanza only works if read in his Cottonera dialect.

The vowel U after Għ 
The vowel u after għ remains an /u:/ as in the English loot, instead of diphthongizing to /au/ as in the English town.

The vowel E after Għ 
Although in contemporary Maltese (21st Century), the combination /għe/ sometimes produces an /a/ vowel, the Cottonera dialect has widely kept the /e~i/ realization comparable to Standard Maltese.

The consonant Q 
In Cottonera, most notably among the eldest demographic of Senglea, the consonant q is still pronounced as a voiceless uvular plosive /q/, as its counterpart in Classical Arabic. This sound survived in Modern Maltese only through the Cottonera dialect, instead of being replaced with the Standard glottal stop /ʔ/. However, it is important to note that it is severely in decline.

References 

Languages of Malta